My Friend Walter is a children's fiction novel by Michael Morpurgo. It was first published in Great Britain by William Heinemann in 1988. The book was shortlisted for the 1989 Smarties Prize.

This book is based on a girl called Bess, when she goes to a family reunion, she meets a stranger who tells her to visit the Bloody Tower, in london. Bess sees Sir Walter Raleigh in London and Walter asked Bess if he could come and live on her estate. (But remember he is a ghost and ghosts get up to different types of mischiefs.)

Film
There was also a telefilm adaptation of My Friend Walter in 1992, starring Polly Grant as Bess Throckmorton and Ronald Pickup as Sir Walter Raleigh. Directed by Gavin Millar. It was shown in two parts between 24 April and 1 May 1992 as part of ITV's CITV strand.  It also aired on PBS on 21 November 1993.

Notes

External links

1988 British novels
British novels adapted into films
Cultural depictions of Walter Raleigh
British children's novels
1988 children's books
1992 television films
1992 films
Heinemann (publisher) books